Sveinung O. Flaaten (25 January 1898 – 11 June 1962) was a Norwegian politician for the Conservative Party.

He was born in Hitterdal.

He was elected to the Norwegian Parliament from Telemark in 1961, but died before one year of his term had passed. He was replaced by Didrik Cappelen.

Flaaten was previously deputy mayor of Heddal municipality in 1959–1960, and mayor in 1960–1961.

Outside politics he worked as a school teacher and a farmer.

References

1898 births
1962 deaths
Conservative Party (Norway) politicians
Members of the Storting
Mayors of places in Telemark
20th-century Norwegian politicians